Lycastris flaviscutatus is a species of syrphid fly in the family Syrphidae.

Distribution
China.

References

Eristalinae
Insects described in 2009
Diptera of Asia